George Vjestica is a British guitarist and songwriter. He leads the group Bandante. Vjestica is also known for working with Australian singer Nick Cave and with Warren Ellis on film soundtracks, The Proposition and Lawless. He has also performed on the Nick Cave and the Bad Seeds albums Push the Sky Away (as a guest)  and Skeleton Tree (as a full-time band member).  His last name Vjestica means "witch" in Croatian.

Career 
From 2006 to 2010 Vjestica toured and recorded with Groove Armada, appearing on albums, Black Light and Soundboy Rock.

He has also toured with John Squire (Stone Roses), appearing on the Marshall's House album, and played guitar on KT Tunstall's debut EP False Alarm which features on the multi-million selling album Eye to the Telescope.

Although best known for his guitar work in various bands, Vjestica has released one double-sided single, "Bang Bang/She Put a Spell in Me".

Personal life 
In 2009, Vjestica married the writer Rosie Mortimer with whom he has two sons.

References 

"Nick Cave on Lawless, the sentimentality of sadists, and the war on drugs". avclub.com
"Nick Cave and the Bad Seeds deliver the last rites to Glastonbury". godisinthetvzine.co.uk
"MusicTAP" . MusicTAP
"‘Welcome Back to Milk’ by Du Blonde Review". Wall Street Journal. Jim Fusilli, July 22, 2015 .

External links
https://web.archive.org/web/20130117084928/http://visualsound.net/george-vjestica-uk/
https://www.nme.com/nme-video/youtube/id/EXBXjR6Kgds
http://www.discogs.com/search?type=all&q=George+Vjestica&corrected=1

Living people
1967 births